Lie Detector is a television series broadcast in 2005 on Pax TV. Hosted by Rolonda Watts with assistance from polygraph administrator Dr. Ed Gelb, the show claims to "[examine] the truth behind real-life stories ripped from the headlines." It premiered on March 8, 2005 and ended after one season. Other versions under the same title have aired under various arrangements in the past, as described further below.

Its first episode featured a polygraph examination of Paula Jones, a woman who had accused Bill Clinton of sexual harassment.

An earlier version of the show was hosted by F. Lee Bailey in syndication in 1983, also involving Gelb, which included appearances by Caril Ann Fugate, Melvin Dummar and Ronald Reagan's barber.

Episodes

References

External links
 
 

PAX TV original programming
2000s American reality television series
2005 American television series debuts
2005 American television series endings
Television series by Ralph Andrews Productions
English-language television shows